St Aidan's College is a college of the University of Durham in England. Founded in 1947 as the St Aidan's Society, but able to trace its roots back to the end of the 19th century, the college is named for St Aidan of Lindisfarne.

History

The college has its origins in the small group of women, known as home students, who were first allowed to study at Durham in 1895. At that time, and indeed until the Second World War, it was considered unsuitable for female students to live in lodgings: they either had to be members of a college or to live at home. The numbers were never very large; for example, in 1936 there were only five. However, a substantial increase in the number of female students after 1945 meant that the former group of home students was reorganised, emerging as the St Aidan's Society in 1947.

The St Aidan's Society had its offices at 24 North Bailey (now the bar and club of the Durham Union Society). Some of the students lived in Shincliffe Hall and others in lodgings. A common room was soon found in 50 North Bailey and chapel services held at the church of St Mary-le-Bow. The first principal was Ethleen Scott, having been "Censor" of the female home students since 1937.

In 1961 St Aidan's was reconstituted as a full "council college", meaning that its governing council is a sub-committee of the university council, the university's governing body. It moved to its present buildings on Elvet Hill in September 1964, becoming one of the first of the university's "Hill" colleges. The college buildings are in a modernist style, having been designed by architect Sir Basil Spence and arranged in a semi-circular arrangement surrounding a central lawn. The original design was intended to represent the hand of God holding a jewel, with the curved corridors as the fingers, the straight corridors as his thumb, and a small chapel as the jewel. However, financial constraints prevented the chapel from ever being built and later extensions to the straight section did not follow the original idea.

In 1963, Scott was succeeded as principal by Dame Enid Russell-Smith, who handed over to Irene Hindmarsh in 1970. It was during her tenure as principal that it was agreed that St Aidan's should become a mixed college. The first male students were admitted in 1981.

John Ashworth took over in 1998, before becoming dean of colleges in 2007, at which point Susan Frenk became acting principal. In 2008 work on improvements to the extensions were started. The aim was to turn previous fresher rooms into ensuite accommodation for finalists and postgraduates. The newly refurbished extensions, named the Elizabeth Pease House, were opened to students in 2009.

Organisation

The college membership divides itself between the senior common room (SCR) and the junior common room (JCR). The SCR is a self-regulating body of senior members of the university, college officers, tutors and postgraduate students. The JCR consists of the undergraduate members of the college and elects its own officers, including a sabbatical president and a bar steward, who liaise on its behalf with the college and university.

Principals
The current principal is Susan Frenk, a lecturer in Spanish and Latin-American culture.
Ethleen Scott (1947?–1970)
Dame Enid Russell-Smith (1963–1970)
Irene Hindmarsh (1970–1988)
Robert Williams (1991–1997)
John Ashworth (1998–2007)
Susan Frenk (2007–present)

Societies

Hockey club
There are currently one men's and one woman's hockey teams playing in the premiership. Both teams have recently been highly successful in the cup competition with the woman winning it in 2021 and the men winning the competeition in 2022.

Boat club
In 1954 St Aidan's College Boat Club (SACBC) was founded. Today the club shares a boathouse with University College Boat Club. The club competes with other colleges, as well as competing in the Durham Regatta.

Association football
St Aidan's College participates in the intercollegiate football league. There are six men's and one women's team. The Women's A team is joint with Hatfield college and are in the women's premiership division. The men's A and B team are both in Men's Division 1, men's C team is in Division 3, men's D & F team in division 6A and the might men's E team in division 6B.

Women's rugby
Van Maidan's women's rugby is a joint team with neighbouring college Van Mildert. As of the academic year 2021-2022, the Van Maidan's compete with other colleges in the Durham premiership.

Running Club
St. Aidan's running club was officially founded in June of 2022, although had unofficially operated between three of the founding members as of about a month earlier, when they attended a park run in Durham.  This event attracted criticism from some after one of the three used the word 'Quadzilla' in the caption of a picture of the circumstance.  The aims of the club, under the premiership of the current (founding) president, Aidan Cairns, are to carry out a weekly fast and slow run, and to send a group to park run every week.  The group also wishes to source t-shirts bearing 'Aidan's Running Club', in order to create a rivalry with St. Mary's Running Club, a running group from another Durham college.

Controversies

Fire safety prevention door fines
On the 14th January 2022, the fire safety doors on multiple corridors, known within the college as 'C straight' and 'B curve' were damaged. The college announced intentions to include a fine separate to pre-existing payments for students living on these corridors to cover the repair expenses. In response, students wrote an open letter criticising the measures proposed. In this letter, the students asked the college board "How can you justify a collective economic punishment despite this violating well-established moral principles of punishment?", and inquired how the college can justify "the extreme excessiveness of fining hundreds of people for the actions of one, especially when those very same people aided you in giving general information about the event?". Dr Susan Frenk responded to the letter in an email addressed to all students of the college, replying that "there is no magic pot of gold, even in the rainbow college, to pay for acts of deliberate destruction... Until two years ago, a sum was ring-fenced from the residence fees in each college, to pay for unattributable damage where those responsible did not come forward. That has ceased because it was seen as encouraging a lack of personal responsibility and penalising innocent students. Yet without it, we have had to introduce collective payment in the areas where damage is inflicted". No fines have been issued as of yet.

Notable alumni

 Jon Ashworth MP – Member of Parliament for Leicester South (2011–present) and Shadow Secretary of State for Health and Social Care (2017–present)
 Josh Beaumont – Sale Sharks and England national rugby union team professional rugby player
 Graham Brady MP – Conservative Member of Parliament for Altrincham and Sale West (1997–present)
 Beverley Goodger – Winner of the first Society of Biology's School Biology Teacher of the Year for 2013.
 Monica Grady – Professor of Planetary and Space Science at the Open University
 Judith Hann – freelance broadcaster and writer, former Tomorrow's World presenter
 Ruth Alcroft –  Labour City Councillor and parliamentary candidate for Carlisle
 Shona McIsaac MP – Labour Member of Parliament for Cleethorpes (1997–2010)
 Nick Mohammed – comedian and actor
 Stéphanie Nicolle – Adjunct Professor of Immovable Property, Institute of Law, Jersey (2009–2012); HM Solicitor General for Jersey (1994–2008)
 Dame Caroline Swift – leading counsel to the Inquiry in the Shipman Inquiry and Justice of the High Court (Kings Bench Division)

References

Sources
 Rodmell, Graham. St Aidans: from Home Students to Society to College. University of Durham, 1997.  
Kelly, Frank. Aidan's students protest collective punishment for fire door damage. Palatinate, 24th February 2022, No.849.

External links
 St Aidan's on Durham University website
 St Aidan's College JCR website
 St Aidan's College SCR postgraduate student and staff organisation

Colleges of Durham University
Educational institutions established in 1947
Basil Spence buildings
Former women's universities and colleges in the United Kingdom
1947 establishments in England